Anneke Blok (born 24 December 1959) is a Dutch actress. She won the 2008 Golden Calf for Best Actress award for her performance as Anne in Tiramisu.

Selected filmography

References

External links 

1959 births
Living people
Dutch film actresses
People from Rheden
Golden Calf winners
20th-century Dutch actresses
21st-century Dutch actresses